This article lists political parties in Ivory Coast.  Ivory Coast is a multiparty state.

The Democratic Party of Côte d'Ivoire  (PDCI) was the sole legal party from 1960 to 1990. It would rule for another nine years until a 1999 coup.  The Ivorian Popular Front (FPI) came to power after disputed elections in 2000, and would rule until it was ousted by the Rally of the Republicans in 2010. There are currently more than a hundred legal parties, though few have significant national support.

Current parties

Parliamentary parties

Former Rebel Parties
Patriotic Movement of Ivory Coast (Mouvement patriotique de Côte d'Ivoire, MPCI)
Ivorian Popular Movement of the Great West (Mouvement populaire ivoirien du Grand Ouest, MPIGO)  
Movement for Justice and Peace (Mouvement pour la justice et la paix,  MJP)
New Forces (les Forces Nouvelles de Côte d'Ivoire;  FNCI or FN) Formed in December 2002 a coalition these three parties.

Smaller parties
Alliance for a New Côte d'Ivoire (Alliance pour une Nouvelle Côte d'Ivoire, ANCI)
Citizens' Democratic Union (Union démocratique citoyenne de Côte d'Ivoire, UDCY) 
Ecological Party (Parti Ecologique Ivoirien, PEI)
Ivoirian Communist Party (Parti communiste ivoirien, PCI)
Ivorian People's Party (le Parti du Peuple Ivoirien, lePDPI.org) 
Ivorian Workers' Party (Parti ivoirien des travailleurs, PIT)
Liberal Force (Force liberale, FL) 
Movement for the Total Liberation of Côte d'Ivoire (Mouvement pour la libération totale de la Côte d'Ivoire, MLTCI) 
Movement of Future Forces (Mouvement des Forces de l'Avenir)
Nationalist Party (Parti Nationaliste, PANA)
Party for the Protection of the Environment (Parti pour la protection de l'environnement, PPE)
Party for Progress and Socialism (Parti pour le progrès et le socialisme, PPS)
Revolutionary Communist Party of Côte d'Ivoire (Parti communiste révolutionnaire de Côte d'Ivoire, PCRCI)
Socialist Front for Independence and Liberty (Front socialiste pour l'indépendance et la liberté, FSIL)
Socialist People's Union (Union socialiste du peuple, USP)
The Renaissance (La Renaissance)
Union for Democracy and Peace in Côte d'Ivoire (Union pour la démocratie et la paix en Côte d’Ivoire, UDPCI)
Union of Democrats of Côte d'Ivoire (Union des Démocrates de Côte d'Ivoire)
Union of Social Democrats (Union des socio-démocrates, USD)

See also

 Lists of political parties

 
Ivory Coast
Political parties
Ivory Coast
Political parties